In the context of the Spanish Empire, a peninsular (pl. peninsulares) was a Spaniard born in Spain residing in the New World, Spanish East Indies, or Spanish Guinea. Nowadays, the word peninsulares makes reference to Peninsular Spain and in contrast to the "islanders" (isleños), from the Balearic Islands, the Canary Islands or the territories of Ceuta and Melilla.

A equivalent to the Spanish peninsulares in the Portuguese Colonial Brazil was the reinóis, Portuguese people born in Portugal, while Portuguese born in Brazil with both parents being reinóis were known as mazombos.

Spaniards born in the Spanish Philippines were called insular/es or originally filipino/s, before "Filipino" now came to be known as all of the modern citizens of the now sovereign independent Philippines. Spaniards born in the colonies of the New World that today comprises the Hispanic America are called criollos (individuals of wholly European Spanish descent, but born in the New World).

Higher offices in Spanish America and the Spanish Philippines were held by peninsulares. Apart from the distinction of peninsulares from criollo, the castas system distinguished also mestizos of mixed Spanish and Amerindian ancestry in the Americas, and 'mestizos de español' (mixed Spanish and native Filipino (Spanish Filipino)), or 'tornatras' (mixed Spanish and Sangley Chinese (Chinese Filipino)) in the Philippines / Spanish East Indies, mulatos (of mixed Spanish and black ancestry), indios (Amerindians / Native Filipinos), zambos (mixed Amerindian and black ancestry) and finally negros. In some places and times, such as during the wars of independence, peninsulares or members of conservative parties were called depreciatively godos (meaning Goths, referring to the "Visigoths", who had ruled Spain and were considered the origin of Spanish aristocracy) or, in Mexico, gachupines. Godos is still used pejoratively in the Canary Islands for the peninsular Spanish, and in Chile for Spaniards.

Colonial officials at the highest levels arrived from Spain to fulfill their duty to govern Spanish colonies in Latin America and the Philippines. They defended Cádiz's monopoly on trade, upsetting the criollos, who turned to contraband with British and French colonies, especially in areas away from the main ports of call for the Flota de Indias. They worked to preserve centralized imperial power and sometimes acted as agents of patrol.

See also
Dominant minority
Isleños
Gachupín
List of governors in the viceroyalty of the Río de la Plata
List of viceroys of New Granada
List of viceroys of New Spain
List of viceroys of Peru

References

Ethnic groups in the Americas
Ethnic groups in Latin America
Latin American caste system
Spanish colonization of the Americas
White Latin American